A Brighter Summer Day is a 1991 Taiwanese epic teen crime drama film directed by Edward Yang, associated with the "New Taiwanese Cinema." The English title is derived from the lyrics of Elvis Presley's "Are You Lonesome Tonight?". The film was selected as the Taiwanese entry for the Best Foreign Language Film at the 64th Academy Awards but was not nominated.

Set in the late 1950s and early 1960s, the film centers on Xiao Si’r (Chang Chen), a boy from a middle-class home who veers into juvenile delinquency.

A Brighter Summer Day was ranked 78th in the 2022 Sight & Sound Greatest Films of All Time poll, one of four Chinese-language films to be included and above Yang's Yi Yi.

Plot
Zhang Zhen (nickname Si'r), a junior high student in 1959 Taipei, is forced to attend night school after failing a test. This upsets his father, a career government worker, who is aware of and worried about the delinquency rampant among night school students. The next morning, Si'r and his father listen to a radio broadcast of distinguished students.

In 1960, Si'r, along with his best friend, Cat, spy on an actress changing clothes during the filming of a drama in a movie studio. Caught by a guard, they steal his flashlight and flee back to school. Si'r, noticing movement in a darkened classroom, turns on the flashlight and startles a pair of lovers but does not see their faces. Two gangs, the Little Park Boys and their rivals the 217s, are introduced. Si'r is not a member of either gang but he is closer to the Little Park Boys. The Little Park Boys are led by Honey, who is hiding in Tainan from police after killing one of the 217s over his girlfriend, Ming. Sly leads the gang in his absence. Sly and Si'r become rivals after Si'r gets Sly in trouble, believing him and his girlfriend, Jade, to be the pair of lovers he saw. Meanwhile, Si'r and Ming meet by chance and become friends.

Sly proposes a truce, arranging a concert with members from both gangs. Honey unexpectedly resurfaces and berates Sly for setting up the concert; however, he realizes the gang respects Sly more. The night before the concert, Honey "bequeaths" Ming to Si'r, believing him to be a stable boyfriend. The next night, Honey appears outside of the concert hall, antagonizing the 217s. Honey takes an ostensibly friendly walk with the 217's leader, Shandong, only to be killed when Shandong pushes him in front of an oncoming car. The Little Park Boys do not believe police reports that it is an accident, and plot revenge; they murder the 217s, including Shandong, during a typhoon, using weapons acquired by Ma, one of Si'r's wealthy classmates. Sly and the surviving Little Park Boys go into hiding. The same night, Si'r's father is arrested by secret police and interrogated about his past connections with the Chinese Communist Party. While eventually freed, he is demoted.

Si'r starts dating Ming and seems to be improving academically. However, she reveals her flirtations with other boys, including an older doctor, bothering Si'r. The next day, Si'r is expelled after lashing out at the doctor and smashing a light bulb. He promises to pass his transfer exams to get into day school, upsetting Ming, who knows this means she will see him less. Later, Sly emerges from hiding and apologizes to Si'r for their past feud and reveals that Ming and Ma are dating. Upset, Si'r begins dating Jade, but he upsets her and she bitterly reveals that the girl he saw kissing Sly was Ming, not her.

After threatening Ma at his home, Si'r steals Cat's knife and waits outside the school for him. Instead, he sees Ming and berates her for her promiscuity, saying that he is her only hope. Ming chides Si'r for being selfish and trying to change her; like the world, she cannot be changed. He stabs her to death and breaks down. Si'r is sentenced to death but the media frenzy around the case provokes the sentence to be changed to 15 years imprisonment. In Si'r's now-barren house, his mother unexpectedly finds Si'r's school uniform. As she sobs, the radio broadcasts a list of distinguished students.

Cast
Chang Chen as Xiao Si'r (Chang Chen, Xiao Si'r being a nickname that means "Little Four", or the fourth of five children)
Chang Kuo-chu as Xiao Si'r's father
Elaine Jin as Xiao Si'r's mother
Lisa Yang as Ming
Wong Chi-zan as Cat (Wang Mao)
Lawrence Ko as Airplane 
Tan Chih-kang as Ma
Lin Hong-ming as Honey
Hung-Yu Chen as Sly
Wang Chuan as Xiao Si'r's eldest sister
Chang Han as Lao Er (elder brother)
Chiang Hsiu-chiung as Xiao Si'r's middle sister
Lai Fan-yun as Xiao Si'r's youngest sister

Production
Set in early 1960s, in Taipei, the film is based on a real incident that the director remembers from his school days when he was 13. The original Chinese title, translates literally as "The Homicide Incident of the Youth on Guling Street", referring to the 14-year-old son of a civil servant who murders his girlfriend, who was also involved with a teenaged gang leader, for unclear reasons. The gang leader and girlfriend are involved in the conflict between gangs of children of formerly-mainland families and those of Taiwanese families. The film places the murder incident in the context of the political environment in Taiwan at that time. The film's political background is introduced in intertitles thus:

Chang Kuo-chu, and his son Chang Chen (in his debut) are both cast in this film playing father and son.

Yang used Goodfellas as the model of a gangster movie.

Critical reception
The film received much critical acclaim and was awarded several wins in Golden Horse Film Festival, Asia Pacific Film Festival, Kinema Junpo Awards and Tokyo International Film Festival. Three different versions of the film were edited: the original 237-minute version, a three-hour version and a shorter 127-minute version.

A Brighter Summer Day is ranked as the 121st most acclaimed film ever and the most acclaimed from 1991 on the review-compiling list They Shoot Pictures, Don't They?. On Rotten Tomatoes, the films holds a perfect rating of 100% based on 20 reviews, with an average score of 9.40/10. The site's critics' consensus reads: "A fantastic cinematic and artistic achievement, Edward Yang's A Brighter Summer Day depicts youth, ideals, violence and politics in a melancholic, tender light, culminating in a complex portrait of Taiwanese identity." 

A.O. Scott wrote in his 2011 review for The New York Times, "In every aspect of technique —from the smoky colors and the bustling, off-center compositions to the architecture of the story and the emotional precision of the performances — this film is a work of absolute mastery." 
David Bordwell considers it his favorite Yang film and voted it as one of the 10 best films of the 1990s. He argues that in A Brighter Summer Day, Yang combined some of the cinematographic and staging tendencies that were revealed to him by his contemporary Hou Hsiao-hsien's A City of Sadness and other contemporary films. He also remarks that the "breadth of action is extraordinary, and a sense of the contradictory pulls of daily life emerges steadily... the result is a dispassionate look at teenaged passions, a deromanticized treatment of young people growing up in a repressive milieu." Jonathan Rosenbaum named it one of his 100 favorite films of all-time in 2004 and arguably the greatest Taiwanese film ever, likewise voted it one of the 10 best films of the 1990s, and extolled its "novelistic richness of character, setting, and milieu," use of objects, significance in the Taiwanese New Wave, and likened it to Rebel Without a Cause in their "nocturnal lyricism and cosmic despair." In Film Comments best films of the 1990s poll, A Brighter Summer Day was considered one of the 10 best or 10 most underrated films of the 1990s by 7 critics, academics, and programmers, including Barbara Scharres, former programmer at the Chicago Film Center, who named it the film of the 1990s, calling it a "film that transforms narrative through its deeply personal sense of observation, and grips the emotions and imagination with its steadfast power." Ari Aster named it one of his favorite films in The Criterion Collection in 2018 and commented that "A Brighter Summer Day is just an amazing gangland epic. I don’t know how you watch it without becoming convinced that you’re watching the greatest movie ever made. It’s like The Godfather in that way."

Themes
According to film critic Godfrey Cheshire, the film has "two faces, just as it has two titles" due to the sudden change of plots the film experiences halfway through its running time. A Brighter Summer Day shifts from a fraught, violent story about teenage gangs to a more introspective and family-oriented movie where the main character passively witnesses how his father is accused of espionage, his brother is in huge debt and his mother suffers in silence. Cheshire explains this transition of "faces":

The film's story reflects divisions of nationality, culture, and age in Taiwan a decade after the island was occupied by the Nationalist Chinese government following the end of mainland China's civil war and the establishment of the Communist People's Republic of China.  The young characters in the film are affected by the social dislocations caused by their families' exile, changes in traditional social values, the turmoil of young love and friendships, and the lack of a clear direction to a meaningful future. Gradually developing youth gangs, coming under the sponsorship of adult criminals, provide some degree of social acceptance. The adults in their lives, such as Si'r's father, are constricted by their own social status and jobs, the need for money, and unrewarding employment.  Further context is seen in the ethnic and class tensions between Chinese, native Taiwanese, and Japanese residents of the island, as well as the cultural influence of the West, especially the United States.

Restoration and home media
In 2009, the World Cinema Foundation issued a restoration of A Brighter Summer Day, using the original 35mm camera and sound negatives provided by the Edward Yang Estate.

On December 17, 2015, The Criterion Collection announced the official North American DVD and Blu-ray release of a new 4K digital restoration of the film in its original running time. This release marks the first time A Brighter Summer Day is released on home video in the United States, after more than two decades of obscurity due to difficulty in finding an official copy of the film. The release includes a new English subtitle translation, an audio commentary featuring critic Tony Rayns, an interview with actor Chang Chen; Our Time, Our Story, a 117-minute documentary from 2002 about the New Taiwan Cinema movement, featuring interviews with Yang and film-makers Hou Hsiao-hsien and Tsai Ming-liang, among others; a videotaped performance of director Edward Yang's 1992 play Likely Consequence; an essay by critic Godfrey Cheshire, and a 1991 director's statement by Yang.

See also
List of submissions to the 64th Academy Awards for Best Foreign Language Film
List of Taiwanese submissions for the Academy Award for Best Foreign Language Film
List of films with a 100% rating on Rotten Tomatoes, a review aggregator website

References

External links

A Brighter Summer Day at Turner Classic Movies
A Brighter Summer Day: Coming of Age in Taipei an essay by Godfrey Cheshire at the Criterion Collection

1991 films
1991 drama films
Central Motion Picture Corporation films
Drama films based on actual events
Films directed by Edward Yang
Films set in 1960
Films set in 1961
1990s Mandarin-language films
1990s political drama films
Shanghainese-language films
Taiwanese drama films
Taiwanese-language films
Films about adolescence
Films about puberty
Teen crime films
1990s coming-of-age drama films